Max Wilson (June 3, 1916 – January 2, 1977) was an American professional baseball pitcher who appeared in 12 games in Major League Baseball as a reliever during two partial seasons  for the Philadelphia Phillies and Washington Senators. He interrupted his baseball career to serve in the United States Navy in the Pacific Theater of World War II between 1942 and 1945.

In Wilson's two MLB stints, he allowed 32 hits, 11 bases on balls and 20 earned runs in 19 innings pitched, dropping his only decision, on May 9, 1946, against the Detroit Tigers. He struck out 11 and compiled subpar earned run average of 9.15.  However, he was a highly successful pitcher in the lower minors, putting up a 54–29 won–lost mark in three seasons in the Class B Piedmont League (1939–1941). Then, after the war, he posted seasons of 15–4 and 13–3 in the Class D Coastal Plain and Class B Carolina Leagues.

Altogether, his baseball career lasted eight seasons (1938–1941 and 1946–1949). Wilson died in Greensboro, North Carolina, at age 60 on January 2, 1977.

References

External links

1916 births
1977 deaths
Baseball players from North Carolina
Burlington Bees (Carolina League) players
Chattanooga Lookouts players
Goldsboro Goldbugs players
Major League Baseball pitchers
People from Alamance County, North Carolina
Philadelphia Phillies players
Portsmouth Cubs players
Springfield Indians (baseball) players
United States Navy personnel of World War II
United States Navy sailors
Washington Senators (1901–1960) players
Wilson Tobs players